The following is a list of notable events and releases of the year 2008 in Norwegian music.

Events

January
 25 – Nordlysfestivalen started in Tromsø (January 25 – February 2).
 30 – The Polarjazz Festival 2008 started in Longyearbyen (January 30 – February 2).

February
 5 – Kristiansund Opera Festival opened (February 7 – 23).

March
 18
 Vossajazz started in Voss (March 14–16).
 Mads Berven was awarded Vossajazzprisen 2008.
 19 – Tord Gustavsen performs the commissioned work Restar av lukke – bitar av tru for Vossajazz 2008.

April
 29 –  Bergenfest 2008 started in Bergen (April 29 – May 3).

May
 21
The start of Bergen International Music Festival Festspillene i Bergen 2008 (May 21 – June 4).
 Nattjazz 2008 started in Bergen (May 21 – 31).

June
 12 – Norwegian Wood 2008 started in Oslo, Norway (June 12 – 15).

July
 14 – Moldejazz started in Molde (July 14 – 19).

August
 6 – Sildajazz started in Haugesund (August 6 – 10).
 11 – Oslo Jazzfestival started (August 11 – 16).

September
 4 – The 4th Punktfestivalen started in Kristiansand (September 4 – 6).
 5 – The 5th Ekkofestival started in Bergen (September 5 – 6).
 16 – The DølaJazz started in Lillehammer (September 16 – 19).

October
 1 – The 30th Ultima Oslo Contemporary Music Festival opened in Oslo (Oktober 1–19).
 9 – The 7th Insomnia Festival started in Tromsø (October 9 – 11).
 30 – The 3rd Barents Jazz, Tromsø International Jazz Festival started (October 30 – November 1).

November
 4 – The Oslo World Music Festival started in Oslo (November 4 – 9).

December
 11 – The Nobel Peace Prize Concert was held at Telenor Arena.

Albums released

January

February

March

April

May

June

July

August

September

October

November

December

Unknown date

A

Deaths

March
 15 – Fredrik Friis, composer, singer, and lyricist (born 1923).
 19 – Eivind Solberg, Norwegian trumpeter (born 1933).

 April
 29 – Julie Ege, singer, actress, and model (born 1943).

June
 19 – Antonio Bibalo, Italian-born pianist and composer (born 1922).

July
 3 – Harald Heide-Steen Jr., (lung cancer), Norwegian actor, comedian and jazz singer (born 1939).
 14 – Henki Kolstad, singer and actor (born 1915).

See also
 2008 in Norway
 Music of Norway
 Norway in the Eurovision Song Contest 2008

References

 
Norwegian music
Norwegian
Music
2000s in Norwegian music